Tiky is a pineapple-flavored soft drink distributed by Fabrica de Bebidas Gaseosas Salvavidas, S.A. in Guatemala.

References

Coca-Cola brands
Pineapples
Fruit sodas
Guatemalan cuisine